The 98th Yard is a CTA rail yard in the Roseland neighborhood in the South Side of Chicago, Illinois which stores cars from the Red Line of the Chicago Transit Authority. It is located at 9800 S. State Street, at the intersection of 98th Street with the Dan Ryan Expressway. Currently, 5000-series railcars are stored here.

References

Chicago Transit Authority